Peter or Pete Perry may refer to:

Peter Perry (footballer) (1936–2011), English footballer
Peter Perry (politician) (1792–1851), politician
Peter E. Perry (1901–1993), American politician
Pete Perry (activist), peace and social justice activist
Pete Perry (basketball), American basketball player